José Ramón Alexanko Ventosa (born 19 May 1956) is a Spanish retired footballer and manager, who later served as director of football of Valencia CF.

During his career the central defender played with success for both Athletic Bilbao and Barcelona, winning several accolades for the latter – 16 in total – and appearing in 367 La Liga games over the course of 17 seasons (34 goals).

A Spanish international on more than 30 occasions, Alexanko represented the nation in one World Cup and one European Championship.

Club career

Athletic Bilbao
Born in Barakaldo, Biscay, Alexanko joined Athletic Bilbao's youth system in 1972, then served an unassuming loan with Basque neighbours Deportivo Alavés – second division – and returned subsequently. He made his La Liga debut on 12 December 1976, in a 5–2 home win against RCD Español (30 minutes played).

An undisputed starter from his second season onwards, Alexanko's highlights at Athletic were winning two runners-up medals, one in the Copa del Rey and one in the UEFA Cup, both in 1977. Among his teammates were veterans José Ángel Iribar and Javier Irureta.

Barcelona / Coaching
In 1980, Alexanko signed for FC Barcelona, paving the way for a number of fellow Basque players including José Mari Bakero, Txiki Begiristain, Ion Andoni Goikoetxea, Julio Salinas and Andoni Zubizarreta. With him as captain they formed the backbone of the legendary Dream Team, which won four consecutive league championships and the European Cup for the first time in the club's history.

Among his most memorable moments during his 13 seasons at the Catalan side, Alexanko scored the winning goal as Barcelona beat Real Sociedad 1–0 in the 1988 domestic cup final, also playing about ten minutes in the 1992 European Cup Final. Six years earlier he had his penalty shootout attempt saved by FC Steaua București's Helmuth Duckadam, as Barça lost the 1986 edition in Seville.

After retiring as a player in 1993, Alexanko started a coaching career as he managed Romanian sides FC Universitatea Craiova and FC Naţional București. In the middle of 2000 he returned to Barcelona, assisting head coach Carles Rexach (his teammate in the forward's last season as a player).

In July 2005, Alexanko was named the club's youth system coordinator. On 7 January 2017, he became director of football at Valencia CF in the place of Jesús García Pitarch.

In September 2019, Alexanko was appointed academy and scouting director at South African club Mamelodi Sundowns.

Controversy
Alexanko was accused of raping a maid in a hotel at Papendal, the Netherlands, in 1988. Eventually, all of the charges were dropped.

International career
Alexanko made his debut for Spain on 15 November 1978, playing in the 1–0 home win against Romania for the UEFA Euro 1980 qualifiers. He represented the nation at both Euro 1980 and the 1982 FIFA World Cup, retiring from the international scene at only 26 after the second group stage draw against England in the latter competition, with a total of 34 caps; he also appeared in one game for the Euskadi XI, in 1979.

Honours

Player
Athletic Bilbao
Copa del Rey: Runner-up 1976–77
UEFA Cup: Runner-up 1976–77

Barcelona
La Liga: 1984–85, 1990–91, 1991–92, 1992–93
Copa del Rey: 1980–81, 1982–83, 1987–88, 1989–90
Copa de la Liga: 1982–83, 1985–86
Supercopa de España: 1983, 1991, 1992
European Cup: 1991–92
UEFA Cup Winners' Cup: 1981–82, 1988–89
UEFA Super Cup: 1992

Manager
Universitatea Craiova
Cupa României: Runner-up 1997–98

References

External links

1956 births
Living people
Spanish footballers
Footballers from Barakaldo
Association football defenders
La Liga players
Segunda División players
Tercera División players
CD Laudio players
Bilbao Athletic footballers
Athletic Bilbao footballers
Deportivo Alavés players
FC Barcelona players
Spain under-21 international footballers
Spain international footballers
UEFA Euro 1980 players
1982 FIFA World Cup players
Spanish football managers
FC Progresul București managers
FC U Craiova 1948 managers
Basque Country international footballers